Novy Biktyash (Yañı Biktaş) is a rural locality (a selo) in Sukhorechensky Selsoviet, Bizhbulyaksky District, Bashkortostan, Russia. The population was 315 as of 2010. There are 5 streets.

Geography 
Novy Biktyash is located 31 km northwest of Bizhbulyak (the district's administrative centre) by road. Muradymovo is the nearest rural locality.

References 

Rural localities in Bizhbulyaksky District